Kasaba (internationally known as The Small Town or simply The Town) is a 1997 Turkish film directed by Nuri Bilge Ceylan in his feature film debut.

Reception
According to Camden New Journal, Kasaba garnered acclaim. On Metacritic, which calculated an average rating of 89/100, the film received "universal acclaim".

Cast
Cihat Bütün		
Emin Ceylan		
Fatma Ceylan		
Muzaffer Özdemir		
Havva Sağlam		
Emin Toprak

References

External links
 Official website
 
 Kasaba at altcine

1997 films
Films directed by Nuri Bilge Ceylan
Films set in Turkey
Turkish drama films
1990s Turkish-language films